Signs of Life is a novel by M. John Harrison published in 1997. The dystopian narrative centers on Mick "China" Rose, a biomedical transportation entrepreneur, and his lover Isobel Avens's dream of flying. The novel was nominated for the British Science Fiction Award in 1997, and for the British Fantasy Award the following year.

Mick "China" Rose starts up a medical courier service with associate Choe Ashton, who is given to erratic behavior and gnomic utterances. Their first job is illegally to dump a load of hazardous medical waste. Meanwhile, waitress Isobel Avens, China's live-in lover, dreams, literally, of flying. But as his business expands, Isobel becomes increasingly unhappy, complaining that she can no longer fly in her dreams; soon she leaves China for rich doctor Brian Alexander (one of China's clients) and disappears into Brian's Miami clinic. In a rare moment of candor, Choe tells China about a transcendental experience he once had at beautiful Jumble Wood involving a green-eyed woman. Unable either to comprehend or repeat the experience, Choe makes an annual pilgrimage to the spot. Then Isobel telephones. Rejected by Brian, she is now almost constantly ill after mysterious, and illegal, treatments in Miami. Slowly, horrifyingly, China watches as the treatments begin to take effect: Isobel grows feathers while her metabolism turns birdlike; but she still cannot fly and attempts suicide. China takes her to Brian and demands help. Eventually, Isobel recovers, physically, but she cannot, or will not, give up her dream, and China leaves her. Choe, meanwhile, now rich through an association with gangsters, has bought Jumble Wood and turned it into a toxic waste dump.

References

External links 
 Review
 Signs of Life at Worlds Without End

1997 British novels
British science fiction novels
Victor Gollancz Ltd books